The Senior League World Series East Region is one of six United States regions that currently sends teams to the World Series in Easley, South Carolina. The region's participation in the SLWS dates back to 1962.

East Region States

Region Champions
As of the 2022 Senior League World Series.

Results by State
As of the 2022 Senior League World Series.

See also
East Region in other Little League divisions
Little League – East 1957-2000
Little League – Mid-Atlantic
Little League – New England
Intermediate League
Junior League
Big League

References

Senior League World Series
East
Baseball competitions in the United States